Rosie Lowe is an English singer and songwriter. She rose to prominence by releasing her debut single "Right Thing" in November 2013. She released her debut extended play under the same name the following year. She subsequently released her 2016 debut album, entitled Control, which contains the singles "Worry Bout Us", "Woman" and "So Human", featuring vocals from rapper Little Simz. "Woman" was featured in the soundtrack for the 2017 film The Last Word.

After a period of hiatus, in November 2018 she released the single "The Light" and announced her forthcoming second album and some 2019 tour dates. Her second album, Yu, was released in May 2019.

Discography

Studio albums
 Control (2016)
 YU (2019)

EPs
 Right Thing EP (2014)
 Now, You Know (2021)

Singles

As lead artist
 "Right Thing" (2013)
 "Games" (2014)
 "Water Came Down" (2014)
 "How'd You Like It" (2014)
 "Who's That Girl?" (2015)
 "Worry Bout Us" (2015)
 "Woman" (2016)
 "So Human" (2016) 
 "The Light" (2018)
 "Birdsong" (2019)
 "Pharoah" (2019)
 "The Way" (2019)

As featured artist
 "What Is This" (2017) 
 "Obsession" (2021)

References

External links

Living people
1989 births
21st-century English women singers
21st-century English singers
British contemporary R&B singers
British women record producers
English record producers
English women singer-songwriters
English soul singers
Musicians from Devon
Polydor Records artists